Halušky (plural in Czech and Slovak; , or nokedli; ;) are a traditional variety of thick, soft noodles or dumplings found in many Central and Eastern European cuisines where they are known under different local names, particularly in Slovakia, Czech Republic, Ukraine, Lithuania, Romania, Poland and Hungary. 

In Slovakia, Bryndzové halušky are considered a national dish; a haluskar for dripping batter into stock to create the noodles is a common kitchen utensil. 

Halušky can refer to the dumplings themselves, or to the complete dish. Typically the dish described is noodles with sauteed cabbage and onions.

See also
Gnocchi
Kluski, a Polish dumpling
Passatelli
Spätzle
Strapačky

References

Dumplings
Czech cuisine
Hungarian cuisine
Galusca
Slovak cuisine
Ukrainian cuisine
Polish cuisine
National dishes
Noodle dishes